Common names: temple pit vipers.

Tropidolaemus is a genus of venomous pit vipers found in southern India and Southeast Asia. Currently, 5 species are recognised and no subspecies.

Description 

Tropidolaemus are sexually dimorphic. They have a distinctly broad, triangular-shaped head and a relatively thin body.

They are found in a wide variety of colours and patterns, which are often referred to as "phases". Some sources even classify the different phases as subspecies. Phases vary greatly from having a black or brown colouration as a base, with orange and yellow banding, to others having a light green as the base colour, with yellow or orange banding, and many variations therein.

Geographic range
Tropidolaemus is native to southern India and Southeast Asia.

Behaviour
These species are primarily arboreal, and are excellent climbers. They spend most of their time nearly motionless, in wait for prey to pass by. They may be diurnal or nocturnal, with their activity period depending on the temperature.

Feeding
The diet includes small mammals, birds, lizards and frogs.

Reproduction
The average litter consists of between twelve and fifteen young, with the neonates measuring 12–15 cm (4¾-5⅞ inches) in total length.

Species

T Type species.

Taxonomy
Two species here were once classified as Trimeresurus, but were given their own genus due to distinct morphological characteristics.

One new species, T. laticinctus, was described recently by Kuch, Gumprecht and Melaun (2007). It is found on the Indonesian island of Sulawesi. The type locality is "between L. Posso and Tomini Bay, Celebes" [= between Lake Poso and Tomini Bay, Province of Sulawesi Tengah, Indonesia]."

References

External links

 

Crotalinae
Snake genera
Taxa named by Johann Georg Wagler